The 7th Houston Film Critics Society Awards nominations were announced on the December 8, 2013. The 2013 awards were given out at a ceremony held at the Museum of Fine Arts on December 15, 2013. The awards are presented annually by the Houston Film Critics Society based in Houston, Texas.

Winners and nominees 
Winners are listed first and highlighted with boldface.

Individual awards

Outstanding Cinematic Contribution 
 Eric Harrison

Technical Achievement
 Gravity

References

External links 
 Houston Film Critics Society: Awards

2013
2013 film awards
2013 in Texas
Houston